Charles Chevillet, sieur de Champmeslé, (20 October 1642 – 22 August 1701) was a 17th-century French actor and playwright (see Troupe of the Comédie-Française in 1680).

Champmeslé made his theatre debut in 1665 in a troupe of the province and married Marie Desmares in Rouen on 9 January 1666. He then played at the Théâtre du Marais then at the Hôtel de Bourgogne and became one of the first sociétaires of the Comédie-Française.

When he died, coming out of a tavern, the priest of Saint-Sulpice refused the funeral service and Champmeslé was buried in the garden of his house in Asnières.

Champmeslé also wrote less than a dozen theatre plays, including some in collaboration with Jean de La Fontaine.

He wrote several comedies such as:
 Les Grisettes, 3 acts ;
 Les Grissettes ou Crispin chevalier, 1 act ;
 Le Florentin ;
 La Coupe enchantée ; these two last plays he composed in association with Jean de La Fontaine.

His Œuvres were collected in 1696.

References

External links 
 Champmeslé, his plays and their presentations on CÉSAR

1642 births
1701 deaths
17th-century French male actors
French male stage actors
17th-century French dramatists and playwrights
17th-century French male writers
Sociétaires of the Comédie-Française
Writers from Paris